This is a list of sovereign states by system of government. There is also a political mapping of the world that shows what form of government each country has, as well as a brief description of what each form of government entails. The list is colour-coded according to the type of government, for example: blue represents a republic with an executive head of state, and red is a constitutional monarchy with a ceremonial head of state. The colour-coding also appears on the following map, representing the same government categories. The legend of what the different colours represent is found just below the map. 

It is noteworthy that some scholars in the People's Republic of China claim that the country's system of government is a "semi-presidential system combining party and government in actual operation". Under its constitution, the Chinese President is a largely ceremonial office with limited power. However, since 1993, as a matter of convention, the presidency has been held simultaneously by the General Secretary of the Communist Party, the top leader in the one-party system who heads the Politburo and the Secretariat.

Certain states have been defined as having more than one system of government or a  hybrid system – for instance, Poland possesses a semi-presidential government where the President appoints the Prime Minister or can veto legislation passed by parliament, but its Constitution defines the country as a parliamentary republic and its ministry is subject to parliamentary confidence.

List of countries

Map

Legend
 
 
 
 
 
 
 

 

Note: this chart represent  systems of government, not the  degree of democracy. Several states that are constitutional republics are in practice ruled as authoritarian states.

UN member states and observers

Other states

Systems of governance
Italics indicate states with limited recognition.

Presidential systems
These are systems in which a president is the active head of the executive branch of government, and is elected and remains in office independently of the legislature.

In full presidential systems, the president is both head of state and head of government. There is generally no prime minister, although if one exists, in most cases they serve purely at the discretion of the president.

The following list includes democratic and non-democratic states:

Presidential systems without a prime minister

 

 

 

 
 

Nations with limited recognition are in italics.

Presidential systems with a Supreme Leader

Presidential systems with a prime minister
The following countries have presidential systems where a post of prime minister (official title may vary) exists alongside that of the president. The president is still both the head of state and government and the prime minister's roles are mostly to assist the president. Belarus, Gabon and Kazakhstan, where the prime minister is effectively the head of government and the president the head of state, are exceptions.

 (see Chief of the Cabinet of Ministers)

Nations with limited recognition are in italics.

Semi-presidential systems
In semi-presidential systems, there is always both a president and a head of government, commonly but not exclusively styled as a prime minister. In such systems, the president has genuine executive authority, but the role of a head of government may be exercised by the prime minister.

Premier-presidential systems
The president chooses a prime minister and cabinet from the parliament with approval from the parliament, however only the parliament may remove them from office with a vote of no confidence. The president does not have the right to dismiss the prime minister or the cabinet.

Nations with limited recognition are in italics.

President-parliamentary systems
The president is head of state and the prime minister is head of government, although the prime minister generally works under the discretion of the former more so than in a premier-presidential system. The president chooses the prime minister and the cabinet without a confidence vote from the parliament, but must have the support of a parliamentary majority for their selection. In order to remove a prime minister or their cabinet from power, the president may dismiss them or the parliament can remove them by a vote of no confidence.

Nations with limited recognition are in italics.

Parliamentary republican and related systems
In a parliamentary republic, the head of government is selected or nominated by the legislature and is also accountable to it. The head of state is ordinarily called a president and (in full parliamentary republics) is separate from the head of government, serving a largely apolitical, ceremonial role. In these systems, the head of government is usually called the prime minister, chancellor or premier. In mixed republican systems and directorial republican systems, the head of government also serves as head of state and is usually titled president.

Full parliamentary republican systems
In some full parliamentary systems, the head of state is directly elected by voters. Under other classification systems, however, these systems may instead be classed as semi-presidential systems (despite their weak presidency). Full parliamentary republican systems that do not have a directly elected head of state usually use either an electoral college or a vote in the legislature to appoint the president.

Directly elected head of state

Indirectly elected head of state

Nations with limited recognition are in italics.

Parliamentary republics with an executive presidency
A combined head of state and head of government in the form of an executive president is either elected by the legislature or by voters after candidates are nominated for the post by the legislature (in the case of Kiribati), and they must maintain the confidence of the legislature to remain in office. In effect, "presidents" in this system function the same as prime ministers do in other parliamentary systems.

Assembly-independent republican systems
A combined head of state and head of government (usually titled president) is elected by the legislature but is immune from a vote of no confidence (as is their cabinet), thus acting more independently from the legislature. They may or may not also hold a seat in the legislature.

Directorial republican systems
In a directorial system, a council jointly exercise the powers and ceremonial roles of both the head of state and head of government. The council is elected by the parliament, but it is not subject to parliamentary confidence during its fixed term.

Constitutional monarchies
These are systems in which the head of state is a constitutional monarch; the existence of their office and their ability to exercise their authority is established and restrained by constitutional law.

Constitutional monarchies with ceremonial/non-executive monarchs
Systems in which a prime minister is the active head of the executive branch of government. In some cases, the prime minister is also leader of the legislature, while in other cases the executive branch is clearly separated from legislature (although the entire cabinet or individual ministers must step down in the case of a vote of no confidence). The head of state is a constitutional monarch who normally only exercises his or her powers with the consent of the government, the people and/or their representatives (except in emergencies, e.g. a constitutional crisis or a political deadlock).

Constitutional monarchies with active monarchs
The prime minister is the nation's active executive, but the monarch still has considerable political powers that can be used at their own discretion.

Absolute monarchies
Specifically, monarchies in which the monarch's exercise of power is unconstrained by any substantive constitutional law. The monarch acts as both head of state and head of government.

One-party states
States in which political power is by law concentrated within one political party whose operations are largely fused with the government hierarchy (as opposed to states where the law establishes a multi-party system but this fusion is achieved anyway through electoral fraud or simple inertia).

 (Communist Party leads the United Front) (list)
 (Communist Party) (list)
 (People's Front for Democracy and Justice) (list)
 (Workers' Party leads the Democratic Front) (list)
 (People's Revolutionary Party leads the Front for National Construction) (list)
 (Polisario Front)
 (Communist Party leads the Fatherland Front) (list)

Nations with limited recognition are in italics.

Military juntas
A committee of the nation's military leaders controls the government for the duration of a state of emergency. Constitutional provisions for government are suspended in these states; constitutional forms of government are stated in parentheses.

Transitional governments
States that have a system of government that is in transition or turmoil. These regimes lack a constitutional basis.

Systems of internal structure

Unitary states
A state governed as a single power in which the central government is ultimately supreme and any administrative divisions (sub-national units) exercise only the powers that the central government chooses to delegate. The majority of states in the world have a unitary system of government. Of the 193 UN member states, 126 are governed as centralized unitary states, and an additional 40 are regionalized unitary states.

Centralized unitary states
States in which most power is exercised by the central government. What local authorities do exist have few powers.

Regionalized unitary states

States in which the central government has delegated some of its powers to regional authorities, but where constitutional authority ultimately remains entirely at a national level.

 (59 districts, and 1 autonomous republic)
 (9 departments)
 (16 regions)
 (22 provinces, 5 autonomous regions, 4 province-level municipalities, 2 special administrative regions, and 1 claimed province)
 (34 departments, and 1 capital district)
 (5 regions, and 2 self-governing territories)
 (19 regions, and )
 (18 regions, of which 6 are autonomous)
 (9 regions, and 2 autonomous republics)
 (7 decentralized administrations, and 1 autonomous monastic state)
 (38 provinces, of which 9 have special status)
 (6 districts, Judea and Samaria Area)
 (20 regions, of which 5 are autonomous)
 (47 prefectures)
 (17 regions, 3 cities with region rights)
 (47 counties)
 (4 constituent countries) 
 (15 regions)
 (32 districts, 3 municipalities, and 2 autonomous territorial units) 
 (16 regions, 1 self-administering territory, and 2 states in free association) 
 (15 departments, 2 autonomous regions) 
 (10 counties, 1 autonomous city, 2 integral overseas areas, 3 dependencies)
 (20 provinces, 1 autonomous region, and 1 national capital district)
 (25 regions, and 1 province) 
 (one autonomous region subdivided into 5 provinces and 113 other provinces and independent cities grouped into 17 other non-autonomous regions)
 (18 districts, and 2 autonomous regions)
 (6 districts, and )
 (29 districts, 2 autonomous provinces (one of which is a partially recognized de facto independent state), and 1 autonomous city)
 (9 provinces, and 1 capital territory)
 (9 provinces)
 (8 provinces, 6 special cities, and 1 autonomous province)
 (17 autonomous communities, 15 communities of common-regime, 1 community of chartered regime, 3 chartered provinces, 2 autonomous cities)
 (9 provinces)
 (3 regions, 1 autonomous region, and 1 capital city)
 (21 regions, and )
 (9 regions, 1 autonomous island, 3 boroughs, and 2 cities)
 (24 oblasts, 2 cities with special status, and )
 (4 constituent countries, of which 3 have devolved administrations)
 (3 regions, 1 autonomous republic, and 1 independent city)

Federation

States in which the national government shares power with regional governments with which it has legal or constitutional parity. The central government may or may not be (in theory) a creation of the regional governments.

 (23 provinces and one autonomous city)
 (six states and ten territories)
 (nine states)
 (three regions and three linguistic communities)
 (two entities and one district that is a condominium of the two entities)
 (26 states and the Federal District)
 (ten provinces and three territories)
 (and )
 (10 regions and 2 chartered cities)
 (16 states)
 (28 states and 8 union territories)
 (18 governorates and one region)
 (13 states and three federal territories)
 (32 states)
 (and )
 (seven provinces)
 (36 states and one federal territory: Federal Capital Territory)
 (4 provinces, 2 autonomous territories and 1 federal territory)
 (46 oblasts, 22 republics (one of which is disputed), nine krais, four autonomous okrugs, three federal cities (one of which is disputed), one autonomous oblast)
 (Saint Kitts)
 (six federal member states)
 (ten states)
 (17 states)
 (26 cantons)
 (seven emirates)
 (50 states, one incorporated territory, and one federal district)
 (23 states, one capital district and one federal dependency)

European Union

It has elements of intergovernmentalism, with the European Council acting as its collective "president", and also elements of supranationalism, with the European Commission acting as its executive and bureaucracy.

See also
List of sovereign states
List of countries by date of transition to republican system of government
List of political systems in France
List of current heads of state and government
Government

Notes and references

Notes

References

External links
Global Scan- Election Tracker
Countries categorized by system of government in 20th century at Historical Atlas of 20th Century
A Chronology of political history based on Government form
Political Chronology Chronological development of political history
Bertelsmann Transformation Index 2012

System of government
System
Countries by form of government